The XXX Golden Grand Prix Ivan Yarygin 2019, also known as Ivan Yarygin (Yariguin) 2019 is a United World Wrestling rankings freestyle wrestling international tournament, which was held in Krasnoyarsk, Russia between 24 and 27 of January 2019. It was held as the first of the ranking series of United World Wrestling.

Medal overview

Medal table

Men's freestyle

Women's freestyle

Participating nations
188 competitors from 18 nations participated.

 (3)
 (2)
 (5)
 (11)
 (7)
 (2)
 (1)
 (1)
 (9) 
 (3) 
 (46) 
 (1)
 (2)
 (60)
 (4)
 (6)
 (18)
 (7)

Ranking Series
Ranking Series Calendar 2019:
 1st Ranking Series: 24–28 January, Russia, Krasnoyarsk ⇒ Golden Grand Prix Ivan Yarygin 2019 (FS, WW)
 2nd Ranking Series: 9-10 February, Croatia, Zagreb ⇒ 2019 Grand Prix Zagreb Open (GR)
 3rd Ranking Series: 23-24 February, Hungary, Győr ⇒ Hungarian Grand Prix - Polyák Imre Memorial (GR)  
 4th Ranking Series: 28 February-03 March, Bulgaria, Ruse ⇒ 2019 Dan Kolov & Nikola Petrov Tournament (FS,WW,GR) 
 5th Ranking Series: 23-25 May, Italy, Sassari ⇒ Matteo Pellicone Ranking Series 2019 (FS,WW,GR)
 6th Ranking Series: 11–14 July, Turkey, Istanbul ⇒ 2019 Yasar Dogu Tournament (FS, WW)
 7th Ranking Series: 28 February-03 March, Belarus, Minsk ⇒ 2019 Oleg Karavaev Tournament (GR)

References

External links 

 
Golden Grand Prix Ivan Yarygin
Golden Grand Prix Ivan Yarygin
2019 in sport wrestling
January 2019 sports events in Russia